Al-Khodar or Al-Khiḍr (Arabic: الخضر) is a city in Muthanna Governorate, southern Iraq, located next to the Euphrates river. The city is named after the shrine of al-Khidr which is located there. As of 2018, it has 42,800 inhabitants.

Name
The city is named after the shrine of al-Khidr which is located there. Thousands of people come to the city every year to visit the shrine.

Geography

The area of the city is approximately 1000 km2 (386 sq mi). It is located 27 kilometres (17 miles) southeast of Samawah.

Population
The city is inhabited by a number of Arab tribes who participated in the Iraqi revolt against the British of 1920. Some of the most prominent tribes are the Bani Hajeem, Bani Sa'ad, and the al-'Aboud.   

In 2009, the city had 34,597 inhabitants. By 2018, that number had increased to 42,800.

Neighborhoods
 al-Sana'a
 al-Ansar
 al-Khodar al-Qadim
 al-'Askari
 al-Maqam
 al-'Asri
 al-Imam al-Hasan al-'Askari
 al-Bourisha

References

Populated places on the Euphrates River